The post-Soviet transition in Ukraine was established following the country's independence in 1991 up until the adoption of its constitution in 1996.

Geography

History

Independence

The Ukrainian Soviet Socialist Republic was one of the founding states of the Soviet Union (USSR). Prior to its creation, the Ukrainian People's Republic was proclaimed in 1917 and declared its independence from Russia on 25 January 1918 before being consumed by Soviet Russia in 1921.

In 1985, Mikhail Gorbachev became head of state of the USSR and introduced several policies, such as the perestroika and glasnost. Instead of saving the Soviet regime, the reforms triggered a number of popular upheavals in Europe, such as the fall of the Berlin Wall in 1989.

Between 1990 and 1991, several republics of the Soviet Union proclaimed their state sovereignty and then announced their independence. On July 16, 1990, the Ukrainian SSR's parliament issued its 12th legislation proclaiming the sovereignty of Ukraine's territory and the country eventually declared its independence on August 24, 1991. The declaration was then confirmed by the results of the referendum on December 1 later that year, where 90,3 % of voters were in favor of independence. The same day, Leonid Kravchuk, head of the Supreme Council of Ukraine, was elected as the country's first president. Shortly after, an economic then political crisis developed and Kravchuk organized another presidential election as a response. In 1992, Mykola Plaviuk, the exiled Ukrainian president, handed over powers to Kravchuk, thus declaring the Ukrainian government a legal successor to the Ukrainian People's Republic.

Crisis in Crimea

End of the transitional period

In 1994, Leonid Kuchma was elected by 52% of the voters. He started implementing certain economic reforms paving the way for aid from the International Monetary Fund. However, Kuchma fails to obtain a majority in the following legislative election by parliament and had to share power with the opposition. The 13th legislation was issued by parliament on June 28, 1996, where a constitution was adopted and took effect immediately afterwards. The country's official name became "Ukraine" instead of "Republic of Ukraine".

References

Post-Soviet states
History of Ukraine
Provisional governments